Rakeedhoo (Dhivehi: ރަކީދޫ) is one of the inhabited islands of Vaavu Atoll.

Geography
In 2003, the island was described as the smallest of the inhabited islands in the atoll.

Demography

Healthcare
Rakeedhoo has a pharmacy.

References

Islands of the Maldives